The 2000 Warsaw Cup by Heros was a Tier IV event on the 2000 WTA Tour that ran from May 8–14, 2000. It was held on outdoor clay courts in Warsaw, Poland, and was the sixth year that the event was staged. Henrieta Nagyová of Slovakia reached her third Warsaw Cup by Heros final and won the second Warsaw Cup by Heros title. The doubles tournament won Tathiana Garbin od Italy and Janette Husárová from Slovakia.

Finals

Singles

 Henrieta Nagyová defeated  Amanda Hopmans 2–6, 6–4, 7–5

Doubles

 Tathiana Garbin /  Janette Husárová defeated  Iroda Tulyaganova /  Anna Zaporozhanova 6–3, 6–1

External links
 ITF tournament edition details
 Tournament draws

Warsaw
Warsaw Open
War